Chit Naing is a Burmese politician, writer and Minister of Union Government Office. He previously served as a former Minister of Information.

Early life and education 
He was born in December 1948 in Kyi Ni Village, Chauk Township, Magway Division. He studied basic education at Government Middle School in Kyi Ni village, No (11) High School in Chauk.He attended Mandalay University of Arts and Sciences (MASU) and he holds a bachelor's degree in psychology.

Service life

Military services 
He joined the military in 1971 after graduated in 1970. He served in Lashio, Mingalardon, Nawnghkio, Bahtoo and Kalaw. He has served in Shan State for over 17 years.

Literature 
From August 1995 to November 1997, he served as the Executive Editor-in-Chief of the Myawaddy Literature House, which deals with the military. Since 1984, he has been writing articles on social psychology and youth counseling.He was awarded the 1996 National Literature Prize for youth affairs with his book, "Chit Lo Pyaw Tar Hmat Par" .

In 1999, he led a delegation of Myanmar writers on a friendly visit to the People's Republic of China.He served as the Central Executive Committee of the Myanmar Literature and Press Association.He also served as the director general of Information and Public Relations Department from 1997 to 2009.

Union Minister 
After the military seized power on February 1, 2021, he was appointed as Union Minister of Information in the newly formed Military Government. When the caretaker government was formed on 1 August 2021, he was changed from the Minister of Information to the Minister of the Union Government Office (2).

References 

Government ministers of Myanmar
Information ministers of Myanmar
Burmese writers
Living people
1948 births
Specially Designated Nationals and Blocked Persons List
Individuals related to Myanmar sanctions